Cécilia Catharina Björnsdotter Rodhe (surname sometimes spelled Rhode; formerly Rhodes-Noah; born 1 September 1961) is a former model, Miss Sweden 1978 and competed in the Miss Universe 1978 pageant, held in Mexico, 24 July. In the Miss Universe pageant, she finished fifth place. She is currently a sculptor.

Personal life
From her former marriage to French tennis player Yannick Noah, she has two children, Joakim and Yélena. The 6'11" Joakim played college basketball for the 2006 and 2007 NCAA national champions, the University of Florida Gators, was drafted by the Chicago Bulls of the NBA as the ninth overall pick, and is a two-time All-Star.

Rodhe currently lives in Brooklyn, New York.

References

External links

Official website

1961 births
Living people
20th-century Swedish sculptors
21st-century Swedish sculptors
20th-century Swedish women artists
21st-century Swedish women artists
École des Beaux-Arts alumni
Miss Sweden winners
Miss Universe 1978 contestants
People from Gothenburg
Swedish emigrants to the United States
Swedish expatriates in France
Swedish female models
Swedish women sculptors